The eighth generation of video game consoles began in 2012, and consists of four home video game consoles: the Wii U released in 2012, the PlayStation 4 family in 2013, the Xbox One family in 2013, and the Nintendo Switch family in 2017.

The generation offered few signature hardware innovations. Sony and Microsoft continued to produce new systems with similar designs and capabilities as their predecessors, but with improved performance (processing speed, higher-resolution graphics, and increased storage capacity) that further moved consoles into confluence with personal computers, and furthering support for digital distribution and games as a service. Motion-controlled games of the seventh generation had waned in popularity, but consoles were preparing for advancement of virtual reality (VR), with Sony introducing the PlayStation VR in 2016. Sony focused heavily on its first-party developers and console exclusives as key selling points, while Microsoft expanded its gaming services, creating the Xbox Game Pass subscription service for Xbox and Windows computers, and its xCloud game streaming service. Microsoft and Sony consoles saw mid-generation refreshes, with high-end revisions PlayStation 4 Pro and the Xbox One X, and lower-cost PlayStation 4 Slim and Xbox One S models that lacked some features. As of 2021, the PlayStation 4 and Xbox One families had sold an estimated 116 and 51 million units, respectively.

Nintendo remained on a separate path from Sony or Microsoft in its blue ocean strategy. The Wii U was designed to be a more robust Wii to appeal to dedicated gamers, but its means and purpose were lost in how it was marketed. The Wii U substantially undersold Nintendo's projections, selling only 13.5 million units by its discontinuation in 2017, which drove Nintendo to release the Nintendo Switch by 2017, its design and marketing accounting for several of the faults of the Wii U while meeting a broad range of global demographics and possible gaming situations. Later, Nintendo released the Nintendo Switch Lite, a version that lacked the Switch's docking capabilities but had other component optimization and was otherwise compatible with all games. By December 2021, the two Switch models had shipped a combined 103.54 million units, outselling the Wii.

Handheld consoles fought against increasing pressure of mobile gaming. The Nintendo 3DS and 2DS succeeded the now-discontinued Nintendo DS line, while the PlayStation Vita was the successor to the PlayStation Portable. Combined shipped units of the Nintendo 3DS/2DS family had reached 75 million by September 2019, but the Vita was estimated to have only sold about 10 million by the end of 2015. Sony discontinued the unit in 2019 and stated it had no present plans for handheld systems. Nintendo discontinued the Nintendo 3DS in 2020, effectively ending production of handheld consoles outside of the Switch and Switch Lite.

The eighth-generation console market was also influenced by the lifting of China's ban on video consoles in 2015, as well as the growth of the mobile gaming sector. A number of retro microconsoles were also released during this period.

In November 2020, Sony released the PlayStation 5 and Microsoft the Xbox Series X and Series S. Considered to be their highly anticipated next-generation systems, they continue the trend from the eighth generation with overall general improved computational performance, graphical output, and strong backward compatibility support to minimize the disruption of upgrading to the new platform.

Background 
This generation was predicted to face competition from smartphones, tablets, and smart TVs. In 2013, gaming revenue on Android overtook portable game console revenue, while remaining a distant second to iOS gaming revenue. In fiscal year (FY) 2013 (ending early 2013), Nintendo sold 23.7 million consoles, while Apple sold 58.2 million iPads in FY 2012 (ending late 2012). One particular threat to the traditional console game sales model has been the free-to-play model, wherein most users play free, and either a small number of dedicated players spend enough to cover the rest, or the game is supported by advertising.

The PlayStation 4, Xbox One, and Wii U all use AMD GPUs, and two of them (PS4 and XBO) also use AMD CPUs on an x86-64 architecture, similar to common personal computers (as opposed to the IBM PowerPC Architecture used in the previous generation). Microsoft, Nintendo, and Sony were not aware that they were all using AMD hardware until their consoles were announced. This shift was considered to be beneficial for multi-platform development, due to the increased similarities between PC hardware and console hardware. It also provided a boost in market share for AMD (which had faced increased competition from Intel in the PC market).

Various microconsoles (which are smaller and mostly Android-based) have been released since 2012, although they are seldom referred to as being part of the eighth (or any) generation of video game consoles. These microconsoles have included the Ouya, Nvidia Shield Console, Amazon Fire TV, PlayStation TV, MOJO, Razer Switchblade, GamePop, GameStick, and PC-based Steam Machine consoles. A number of microconsoles that were modeled as scaled-down versions of consoles from previous generations, running a selection of games from that console, were also released. These included the NES Classic Edition, the SNES Classic Edition, the PlayStation Classic, and the Sega Genesis Mini.

Cloud gaming options for the consoles also were developed in the eighth generation. PlayStation Now enables cloud gaming of PlayStation 2, 3, and 4 games to current PlayStation consoles and personal computers. Microsoft began developing a comparable service xCloud for Xbox and Windows games. Google released Stadia, a dedicated cloud gaming platform designed around reduced latency and advanced features not typical of these other cloud gaming options.

Transition 
While earlier console generations generally lasted five to six years, the shift from seventh to eighth generation lasted about eight. Unusually, the prior generation's best-selling unit, the Wii, was the first to be replaced in the eighth generation. In 2011, Microsoft and Sony officials said they considered themselves only halfway through a ten-year lifecycle for their seventh-generation offerings. The companies also said the addition of cameras and motion-based controllers like Xbox's Kinect and PlayStation Move extended these systems' lifetimes. Nintendo president Satoru Iwata said that his company would release the Wii U due to declining sales of seventh-generation home consoles and that "the market is now waiting for a new proposal for home consoles". Sony considered making its next console a digital download-only machine, but decided against it due to concerns about the inconsistency of internet speeds available globally, especially in developing countries.

The introduction of the high-end PlayStation 4 Pro and Xbox One X in 2016 and 2017, respectively, led to some journalists to call these machines part of a "half generation" step within the 8th generation, new consoles that would continue to drive sales without introducing a significantly different line of hardware that would segment their consumer base.

In 2020, Microsoft and Sony released their 9th-generation consoles: Xbox Series X and PlayStation 5. Both said they wanted a soft transition, meaning that the new hardware plays most or all of the platform's previous games. Microsoft said Xbox Series X can play all Xbox One games, including games from the Xbox 360 and original Xbox console that are playable on the Xbox One, and introduced its Smart Delivery program to update some Xbox One games to enable play on the Xbox Series X. Sony has said the "overwhelming majority" of PlayStation 4 games play on the PlayStation 5, and that many run at higher frame rates and resolutions.

Chinese market 

The eighth generation of consoles also saw manufacturers re-enter the Chinese market. Since 2000, the Chinese government had banned the sale and distribution of video game consoles, citing concerns on their effect on youth. The ban led console gaming to a niche sector, including a black market for the purchase of these consoles, while also causing personal computing gaming to take off within China, including the spread of Internet cafes and PC bangs. This ban lasted through January 2014, where the Chinese government first opened up to allow the sale of consoles in the Shanghai Free-Trade Zone (FTZ). By July 2015, the ban on video game consoles was wholly lifted.

Microsoft and Sony quickly took advantage of the lifting of the ban, announcing sales of the Xbox One and PlayStation 4 platforms within the FTZ shortly after the 2014 announcement. Microsoft established a partnership with BesTV New Media Co, a subsidiary of the Shanghai Media Group, to sell Xbox One units in China, with units first shipping by September 2014. Sony worked with Shanghai Oriental Pearl Media in May 2014 to establish manufacturing in the FTZ, with the PlayStation 4 and PlayStation Vita shipping into China by March 2015. CEO of Sony Computer Entertainment Andrew House explained in September 2013 that the company intended to use the PlayStation Vita TV as a low-cost alternative for consumers in an attempt to penetrate the Chinese gaming market.

Nintendo did not initially seek to bring the Wii U into China; Nintendo of America president Reggie Fils-Aime stated that China was of interest to the company after the ban was lifted, but considered that there were similar difficulties with establishing sales there as they had recently had with Brazil. Later, Nintendo had teamed up with Tencent by April 2019 to help sell and distribute the Nintendo Switch as well as aid its games through the Chinese government approval process led by National Radio and Television Administration.

Home consoles

Wii U 

In November 2010, Nintendo of America CEO Reggie Fils-Aime stated that the release of the next generation of Nintendo would be determined by the continued success of the Wii. Nintendo announced its successor to the Wii, the Wii U, at the Electronic Entertainment Expo 2011 on June 7, 2011. After the announcement, several journalists classified the system as the first eighth generation home console. However, prominent sources have disputed this because of its comparative lack of power and older disc media type with respect to the announced specifications for PlayStation 4 and the Xbox One.

The Wii U's main controller, the Wii U GamePad, features an embedded touchscreen that can work as an auxiliary interactive screen in a fashion similar to the Nintendo DS/3DS, or if compatible with "Off TV Play", can even act as the main screen itself, enabling games to be played without the need of a television. The Wii U is compatible with its predecessor's peripherals, such as the Wii Remote Plus, the Nunchuk, and the Wii Balance Board.

The Wii U was released in North America on November 18, 2012, in Europe on November 30, 2012, and in Japan on December 8, 2012. It came in two versions, the Basic Model and the Deluxe/Premium Model, at the price of $300 and $349 US Dollars, respectively. On August 28, 2013, Nintendo announced the production of the Basic model has ended and expected supplies to be exhausted by September 20, 2013. On October 4, 2013, the Deluxe/Premium model was price cut from US$349 to US$300.

The Wii U had lifetime sales of about 13 million, in sharp contrast with the Wii, which had over 100 million over its life. This financially hurt Nintendo, with several financial quarters running at a loss through 2014. Nintendo had anticipated the Wii U would sell similarly to the Wii, but it ended up selling worse than the GameCube and became Nintendo's least successful home console to date. Nintendo officially discontinued the Wii U on January 31, 2017 due to its commercial failure to make way for its second competitor, the Nintendo Switch, released one month later.

PlayStation 4 

On February 20, 2013, Sony announced the PlayStation 4 during a press conference in New York City. The console places an emphasis on features surrounding social interaction. Gameplay videos can be shared via the PlayStation Network and other services. Users can stream games being played by themselves or others (either through the console, or directly to Twitch). The DualShock 4 is similar to the previous DualShock 3 controller with the addition of a touchpad and a "Share" button along with a Light-emitting diode bar on the front to allow motion tracking. The PlayStation Camera camera accessory is offered for the system, with stereo camera lenses up to 1280×800px resolution with support for depth sensing similar to Microsoft's Kinect. It also remains compatible with the PlayStation Move peripherals. Second screen capabilities are available through mobile apps and the PlayStation Vita, as well as cloud gaming streaming through the Gaikai service.

The PlayStation 4 was released on November 15, 2013, in North America and November 29, 2013, in Australia and Europe at US$399.99, A$549 and €399 respectively.

Xbox One 

On May 21, 2013, Microsoft announced the Xbox One at an event in Redmond, Washington. The console focuses on entertainment, including the ability to pass television programming from a set-top box over HDMI and use a built-in electronic program guide, and the ability for computer multitasking by snapping applications (such as Skype and Internet Explorer) to the side of the screen, similarly to Windows 8. The controller has "Impulse Triggers" that provide Haptic technology feedback, and the ability to automatically record and save highlights from gameplay. An updated version of Kinect was developed with a 1080p camera and expanded voice controls. Originally bundled with the console it has since been excluded.

The Xbox One was released in North America, Europe, and Australia on November 22, 2013, at a launch price of US$499.99, €499 and A$599 respectively with Japan, and was later released in 26 other markets in 2014. It had two mid-generation upgrades, one cheaper option released in 2016 called the Xbox One S, and the other called the Xbox One X which added 4K gaming. Microsoft claimed that the Xbox One X was the "World's most powerful console" and 40% more powerful than any other console at the time of its release.

Production of the Xbox One family of consoles were discontinued shortly after the launch of their successor, the Xbox Series X and S, at the end of 2020.

Nintendo Switch 

Due to the commercial failure of the Wii U, along with competition from mobile gaming, then-president Satoru Iwata sought to revitalize the company by creating a new strategy for Nintendo that included embracing mobile gaming, and developing new hardware that would be attractive to a wider range of audiences. The hardware product was announced under the codename NX in a press conference held with DeNA on March 17, 2015, and fully revealed as the Nintendo Switch on October 20, 2016. It was released worldwide on March 3, 2017, competing with the Xbox One and PlayStation 4.

The Switch is considered by Nintendo a home console that has multiple ways to play. The main unit, the Console, is a tablet-sized device with a touch-sensitive screen. It can be inserted into a Docking Station which allows games to be played on a connected television. Alternatively, two Joy-Con, motion-sensitive controllers comparable to the Wii Remotes, can be slotted onto the sides of the Console so the unit can be played as a handheld. Further, the Console can be set on a kickstand, allowing multiple players to see the screen and play games with separate Joy-Con. Additionally, Nintendo built the Switch on standard industry components, allowing for ease of porting games onto the system using standard software libraries and game engines rather than Nintendo's usual proprietary approaches. This enabled them to bring several third-party and independent game developers on board prior to launch to assure some third-party games in their software library.

Despite the Switch being significantly weaker in terms of processing power than its competitors, it was met with critical praise and commercial success. Nintendo had anticipated selling about 10 million Switches in the first year of release but ended up exceeding this projection with total first-year sales of over 17 million units, exceeding the Wii U's lifetime sales. In late 2017, the Nintendo Switch was the fastest selling console in US history, and in November 2018 it was the fastest selling of all the 8th generation consoles in the US.

A hardware revision, the Switch Lite, was announced on July 10, 2019 and was released on September 20, 2019. The unit integrates the Joy-Con onto the main console with a smaller form-factor, making the unit strictly handheld rather than a hybrid system. Further details are described below under Handhelds. An enhanced model was announced on July 7, 2021 and was released on October 8, 2021, featuring a 4K-ready dock, a 7-inch OLED screen, a wider and adjustable stand, enhanced audio, a wired LAN port built into the dock, and 64GB of internal storage.

Comparison

Notes

Handheld systems 

A trend starting from the eighth generation of handheld systems is the general shift from dedicated handheld gaming consoles to mobile gaming on smart devices, such as smartphones and tablets. As such, smart devices have eroded sales of dedicated handheld gaming consoles, with analysts predicting that smart devices will replace handheld gaming consoles in the near future.

Nintendo 3DS

The Nintendo 3DS is a portable game console produced by Nintendo. It is the successor to the Nintendo DS. The autostereoscopic device is able to project stereoscopic 3D effects without the use of 3D glasses or any additional accessories. The Nintendo 3DS features backward compatibility with Nintendo DS series software, including Nintendo DSi software. Announcing the device in March 2010, Nintendo officially unveiled it at E3 2010, with the company inviting attendees to use demonstration units. The console succeeds the Nintendo DS series of handheld systems, which primarily competes with PlayStation Portable. It competes with Sony's handheld, the PlayStation Vita.

The Nintendo 3DS was released in Japan on February 26, 2011; in Europe on March 25, 2011; in North America on March 27, 2011; and in Australia on March 31, 2011. On July 28, 2011, Nintendo announced a major price drop starting August 12. In addition, as of September 2011 consumers who bought the system at its original price have access to ten Nintendo Entertainment System games before they are available to the general public, after which the games may be updated to the versions publicly released on the Nintendo eShop. In December 2011, ten Game Boy Advance games were made available to consumers who bought the system at its original price at no charge, with Nintendo stating it has no plans to release to the general public.

On June 21, 2012, Nintendo announced a bigger model of the 3DS called the Nintendo 3DS XL. Both screens are 90% larger than the original 3DS, but the resolution is the same. It also has a slightly longer battery life. It was released on July 28, 2012, in Europe and August 19, 2012, in North America as well as Australasia on August 23, 2012, and Brazil on September 1, 2012.

On August 28, 2013, Nintendo announced a low cost, 2D version of the 3DS called the Nintendo 2DS. This redesign plays all Nintendo DS and Nintendo 3DS games, albeit without a stereoscopic 3D option. Unlike previous machines of the DS family, the Nintendo 2DS uses a slate-like design instead of a clamshell one. The console launched on October 12 in both Europe and North America as well as Australasia.

On August 29, 2014, Nintendo announced an enhanced revision of the 3DS called the New Nintendo 3DS and New Nintendo 3DS XL. The newer system uses microSD cards rather than full-sized and has a second analog "nub" input, the C-stick, Super-Stable 3D™ (face-tracking technology that allows the glasses-free stereoscopic 3D display to constantly adapt to the user's exact eye position as the player shifts his or her arms and body) and an upgraded processor that allows for more advanced NN3DS-exclusive games (e.g., a 3D port of acclaimed Wii game Xenoblade Chronicles) which cannot be played on the original Nintendo 3DS/2DS, although New Nintendo 3DS can still be played with all 3DS and most DSi games. It was released in Japan on October 11, 2014; in Australasia on November 21, 2014; in Europe on February 13, 2015; in North America on February 13, 2015, for the XL version. The smaller version for North America was released on September 25, 2015, bundled with the game Animal Crossing: Happy Home Designer. In April 2017, Nintendo announced the New Nintendo 2DS XL, released in Japan on July 13, 2017, and in North America on July 28, 2017. It is a streamlined version of the New Nintendo 3DS XL, with identical screen sizes, but with a thinner build and without stereoscopic 3D.

The 3DS family was formally discontinued in September 2020.

PlayStation Vita 

The PlayStation Vita is the second (and final) handheld game console developed by Sony Computer Entertainment. It is the successor to the PlayStation Portable as part of the PlayStation brand of gaming devices. It was released in Japan on December 17, 2011 and was released in Europe and North America on February 22, 2012.

The handheld includes two analog sticks, a  OLED/LCD multi-touch capacitive touchscreen, and supports Bluetooth, Wi-Fi and optional 3G. Internally, the PS Vita features a 4-core ARM Cortex-A9 MPCore processor and a 4-core SGX543MP4+ graphics processing unit (GPU), as well as LiveArea software as its main user interface, which succeeds the XrossMediaBar.

The device is backward-compatible with a subset of the PSP and PS One games digitally released on the PlayStation Network via the PlayStation Store. The graphics for PSP releases are upscaled, with a smoothing filter to reduce pixelation.

Lifetime sales of the Vita have not been released by Sony but have been estimated between 15 and 16 million. Sony discontinued the PlayStation Vita on March 1, 2019, and has no plans for a successor.

Nintendo Switch Lite 

Nintendo released the Nintendo Switch Lite, a hardware revision of the Switch, worldwide on September 20, 2019. Designed as a less expensive version of the Switch, the Switch Lite integrates the Joy-Con onto the hardware unit itself, eliminating some of the Joy-Con's features, which prevents a small number of games in the Switch's library that exclusively require television or tabletop modes from being used on the Switch. Additionally, the Switch Lite cannot be docked. The unit is smaller and lighter than the main Switch console, and uses updated lower-powered hardware that improves its battery performance. It otherwise supports all other features of the Switch, including its communication capabilities.

Handheld comparison

Other handhelds

See also 

 List of video game consoles
 List of home video game consoles
 List of handheld game consoles
 List of dedicated video game consoles
 List of microconsoles

References 

 
History of video game consoles 08
08
.Consoles08
Video game consoles08
2010s video games
.Consoles08
Video game consoles08
2020s video games